Francisco Lachowski (born 13 May 1991) is a Brazilian fashion model. He has been featured in advertisements for a number of notable brands, including Dior Homme, Balmain, Hugo Boss, Etro, L'Oréal, Armani Exchange, H&M, and Tommy Hilfiger. Described as an "übermodel" by Vogue and a "male model legend" by W, Lachowski has been ranked as a top 'Industry Icon' and one of the 'Sexiest Men' by models.com since 2015.

He has ranked #2 on Male Model Scene Top 30 Male Models list.

Career
Lachowski began modeling after he won the Ford Men's Supermodel of the World contest in São Paulo in 2008, for which he was awarded a contract with Ford Models. He has since walked for many notable fashion brands including Jean Paul Gaultier, Dior Homme, Versace, Dolce & Gabbana, DSquared², Gucci, Roberto Cavalli, Thierry Mugler, Armani, and Balmain. He has appeared in campaigns for DKNY, Lacoste, Armani Exchange, Etro, Dior, DSquared², Mavi Jeans, Balmain, and Tommy Hilfiger. He has appeared on the covers of several magazines, including Vanity Teen, Homme Essential, Carbon Copy, Made in Brazil, Chaos, and L'Officiel Hommes. In addition, he has appeared in editorials for GQ, V, Vogue, and FHM.

Lachowski was awarded "Model of the Year: Men (Reader's Choice)" by models.com in 2016. He appeared in Kanye West's music video "Wolves" that same year. In 2018, he was given the "International Male Model" award at GQ Portugal's Men of the Year Awards. He has been the face of the JOOP! Homme Absolute fragrance since 2019.

Personal life 
Lachowski met model Jessiann Gravel Beland in 2010, and the two were married in 2013. They have two sons.

In March 2019, Lachowski and his family published a portrait book in collaboration with photographer Ricardo Gomes.

References

External links 

 
 Francisco Lachowski on Ford Models

Living people
People from Curitiba
Brazilian people of Polish descent
Brazilian people of German descent
Brazilian people of Portuguese descent
Brazilian male models
Brazilian emigrants to France
1991 births